Mark Webster Chatfield (August 11, 1953 – December 23, 1998) was an American breaststroke swimmer and breaststroke specialist.

Chatfield won the gold medal in the 100-meter breaststroke at the 1971 Pan American Games.  He represented the United States as a 19-year-old at the 1972 Summer Olympics in Munich, Germany.  He advanced to the event final of the men's 100-meter breaststroke, finishing fourth with a time of 1:06.1.

He was the 1973 U.S. national champion in the 100-yard breaststroke (57.36).  He attended the University of Southern California (USC), where he swam for the USC Trojans swimming and diving team from 1972 to 1975.  As a college swimmer, he was recognized as an All-American in 1972 (100-yard breaststroke, 200-yard breaststroke), 1973 (100-yard breaststroke, 200-yard breaststroke, 400-yard medley relay), 1974 (100-yard breaststroke, 200-yard breaststroke, 400-yard medley relay), and 1975 (100-yard breaststroke, 200-yard breaststroke, 200-yard individual medley, 400-yard medley relay).

An accomplished Baroque and period musician, vocalist and composer, he played cello and was a countertenor.

Chatfield came out of retirement in 1994 to participate in the Gay Games. He recounted how "he could never disclose his sexuality for fear of losing his spot on the team."

Chatfield died of lymphoma on December 23, 1998; he was 45 years old.

See also
 List of University of Southern California people

References

External links
 L.A. Times Obituary
 List of USC All-American swimmers 
 

1953 births
1998 deaths
American male breaststroke swimmers
American LGBT sportspeople
Olympic swimmers of the United States
Pan American Games gold medalists for the United States
Sportspeople from Bakersfield, California
Swimmers at the 1971 Pan American Games
Swimmers at the 1972 Summer Olympics
USC Trojans men's swimmers
Gay sportsmen
LGBT swimmers
LGBT people from California
Pan American Games medalists in swimming
Universiade medalists in swimming
Universiade gold medalists for the United States
Universiade bronze medalists for the United States
Medalists at the 1973 Summer Universiade
Medalists at the 1971 Pan American Games
20th-century American LGBT people